Agisanyang Mosimanegape (born 29 December 1978) is a Botswana former footballer who played as a defender. He played for the Botswana national football team between 1997 and 2002.

External links

Association football defenders
Botswana footballers
Botswana international footballers
1978 births
Living people
Notwane F.C. players
TAFIC F.C. players